Minice is a municipality and village in Písek District in the South Bohemian Region of the Czech Republic. It has about 30 inhabitants.

References

Villages in Písek District